Chervlyonnye Buruny is a rural locality (a selo) in Nogaysky District, Republic of Dagestan, Russia. The population was 2,066 as of 2010. There are 25 streets. Selo was founded in 1928.

Geography 
Chervlyonnye Buruny is located 24 km of from Terekli-Mekteb (the district's administrative centre) by road. Batyr-Murza and Boranchi are the nearest rural localities.

Nationalities 
Nogais and Chechens live there.

References 

Rural localities in Nogaysky District, Dagestan